Stainton is a village in County Durham, in England. It is situated to the north east of Barnard Castle. Stainton Village has entirely residential with around 100 houses and no local amenities. The former public house, chapel, post office and shop are now private residences. Many of the properties are period properties and owned by older residents. Just across the road from Stainton Village is Broomielaw, once a picnic area and home to an old railway station (now on private land) where Queen Elizabeth The Queen Mother used to travel to get to Streatham Castle.

Stainton Camp was a British Army military installation.

References

External links

Villages in County Durham